Thorleif Holbye (29 April 1883 – 19 October 1959) was a Norwegian sailor who competed in the 1920 Summer Olympics. He was a crew member of the Norwegian boat Irene, which won the gold medal in the 8 metre class (1907 rating).

References

External links
Thorleif Holbye's profile at databaseOlympics
Thorleif Holbye's profile at Sports Reference.com

1883 births
1959 deaths
Norwegian male sailors (sport)
Sailors at the 1920 Summer Olympics – 8 Metre
Olympic sailors of Norway
Olympic gold medalists for Norway
Olympic medalists in sailing
Medalists at the 1920 Summer Olympics